In baseball statistics, a player is credited with a plate appearance (denoted by PA) each time he completes a turn batting.  A player completes a turn batting when: he strikes out or is declared out before reaching first base; or he reaches first base safely or is awarded first base (by a base on balls, hit by pitch, or catcher's interference); or he hits a fair ball which causes a preceding runner to be put out for the third out before he himself is put out or reaches first base safely (see also left on base, fielder's choice, force play). In other words, a plate appearance ends when the batter is put out or becomes a runner. A very similar statistic, at bats, counts a subset of plate appearances that end under certain circumstances.

Pete Rose is the all-time leader with 15,890 career plate appearances. Rose is the only player in MLB history to surpass 14,000 and 15,000 career plate appearances. Carl Yastrzemski (13,992), Hank Aaron (13,941), Rickey Henderson (13,346), Ty Cobb (13,103), and Albert Pujols (13,041) are the only other players to surpass 13,000 career plate appearances.

Key

List

Stats updated as of the end of the 2022 season.

Notes

References

External links

Major League Baseball statistics
Plate appearance leaders